Walter Ronald Fitzgerald (May 8, 1936 – October 11, 2014) was a Canadian politician.

Early life and education
Fitzgerald was born in Halifax, Nova Scotia, the son of Phylis (Rondeau) and Walter Fizgerald. He graduated from Dalhousie University. Prior to his political career, Fitzgerald was a teacher and a former principal at Rockingstone Heights School in the Spryfield area.

Political career
He was first elected alderman for  Halifax, Nova Scotia in 1966. He served as mayor of Halifax from 1971 to 1974, then as MLA for Halifax Chebucto from 1974 to 1981.  He was the last mayor of the old city of Halifax from 1994 to 1996, and was the first mayor of the amalgamated Halifax Regional Municipality from 1996 to 2000. In the election of 2000, he was defeated by former Bedford mayor Peter J. Kelly.

Death
He died on October 11, 2014 in the early morning hours, of heart problems at a hospital in Halifax.

References

Mayors of Halifax, Nova Scotia
Mayors of Halifax Regional Municipality, Nova Scotia
Nova Scotia Liberal Party MLAs
1936 births
2014 deaths